Brian McManus is a Scottish former football midfielder who is currently a Director of Coaching for the La Jolla Impact Select soccer club and the head coach of the UC San Diego women's soccer team.  He is a four-time NCAA Coach of the Year and has led UC San Diego to seven national championships.  He also played in Scotland, one season in the Western Soccer Alliance and one in the American Professional Soccer League.

Playing
McManus played professionally in Scotland for Raith Rovers and Aberdeen F.C. before moving to England to play for Fleetwood F.C. and Barrow A.F.C amongst other north west England non-league teams.  He emigrated to the San Diego in the United States in 1980.  In 1986, he played for the San Diego Nomads of the Western Soccer Alliance, and again in 1989. In 1990, he was with the Portland Timbers of the American Professional Soccer League.  During these years, he was establishing himself as one of the top women's collegiate soccer coaches in the nation.

Coaching
McManus began his coaching career when he became player-manager at Fleetwood Town F.C. for the 1980-81 season. He left his position late in 1980 however to follow a new opportunity in the United States offered to him by Derek Armstrong. According to his biography, he coached semi-pro soccer in Los Angeles, but there is no mention of a team, league or relevant years.  At some point in his career he coached the Torrey Pines High School boys' team.  In 1986, UC San Diego hired McManus as an assistant with its women's soccer team.  In 1987, he became the head coach, a position he holds to this day.  When McManus took on responsibility for the Tritons, they played at the Division III level.  From 1986 until 1999, the Tritons won five Division III championships (1989, 1995, 1996, 1997, 1999).  During those years, McManus was a three-time NCAA coach of the year.  In 2000, the Tritons moved up to Division II.  McManus and his team quickly proved themselves, winning two consecutive national championships (2000, 2001) while McManus was the 2001 Division II Coach of the Year. He was also listed as the semi-pro San Diego Nomads head coach at the beginning of the 1988 season, when Derek Armstrong was their Director of Operations. The following year during the Nomads WSL championship run, he was listed as a player/coach, with Armstrong as the head coach.

See also
List of college women's soccer coaches with 250 wins

References

External links
 UCSD Coaching profile

Scottish footballers
Aberdeen F.C. players
Raith Rovers F.C. players
Western Soccer Alliance players
Nomads Soccer Club players
American Professional Soccer League players
Portland Timbers (1985–1990) players
American soccer coaches
Western Soccer Alliance coaches
Living people
Year of birth missing (living people)
Association football midfielders
Scottish expatriate sportspeople in the United States
Expatriate soccer players in the United States
Scottish expatriate footballers
High school soccer coaches in the United States
UC San Diego Tritons men's soccer coaches